"Sometimes It Hurts" is a song by American industrial rock band Stabbing Westward. The song was released as the second single from the 1998 album Darkest Days.

Music video
The song's music video begins with vocalist Chris Hall waking up in a field following an accident. Hall walks over to a river, where he finds a red-heeled shoe. Hall is lifted by a crane, before he is dropped into a flower garden. Hall is next dragged to an old house where he finds an old dress. The other band members join him before the house is torn down. The video ends as the band members walk off into the sunset.

Track listing
Promo single 1

Promo single 2

Chart positions

Personnel
 Christopher Hall – vocals
 Marcus Eliopulos – guitar
 Jim Sellers – bass
 Walter Flakus – keyboards
 Andy Kubiszewski – drums

References

1998 singles
Stabbing Westward songs
Columbia Records singles
1998 songs
Songs written by Andy Kubiszewski
Songs written by Christopher Hall (musician)
Music videos directed by Kevin Kerslake